The 1979 Montreal Alouettes finished the season in 1st place in the Eastern Conference with an 11–4–1 record and appeared in the 67th Grey Cup. The Alouettes would lose the championship game to the Edmonton Eskimos for the second consecutive year.

Preseason

Regular season

Standings

Schedule

Postseason

Grey Cup

Montreal's star running back David Green became the fifth Alouette to be named Most Outstanding Player. He led the league in rushing with 1678 yards on 287 carries.

References

External links
Official Site

Montreal Alouettes seasons
James S. Dixon Trophy championship seasons
1979 Canadian Football League season by team
1970s in Montreal
1979 in Quebec